Dasylobus argentatus is a species of harvestman in the family Phalangiidae.

Subspecies
Subspecies include:
 Dasylobus argentatus argentatus  (Canestrini, 1871) 
 Dasylobus argentatus cavipalpis  Gruber, 1965

Distribution
This species is present in France and in Italy.

Description
Females are larger than males. These harvestmen show an irregular reddish brown or dark brown saddle on the median back of the body, usually with a median lighter broad band and whitish edges. Pedipalp's claw is small or absent, the tarsal claw of the pedipalp is present, the patellar apophysis is short or absent, the tarsal claw is rather smooth and the longest legs are II. Males can be distinguished on the basis of the chelicerae and the hairy, concave and enlarged patellae.

Bibliography
Canestrini, G. (1871): Nuove specie di Opilionidi Italiani. - Bollettino della Società Entomologica Italiana, Firenze, 3(4), 381–385.
 Minelli, A., Ruffo, S. & La Posta, S. (Eds.): Checklist delle specie della fauna italiana, 21: 8 S. - Calderini, Bologna.
Gruber, J. (1965): Ein Beitrag zur Kenntnis der Weberknechte Italiens, insbesondere Calabriens (Opiliones, Arachnida). - Memorie del Museo Civico di Storia Naturale di Verona, 12 [1964], 291–308.

References

External links
 Photos at Galerie Insecte

Harvestmen
Animals described in 1871